The Rapid Transit Series (RTS) city bus is a long-running series of transit buses that was originally manufactured by GMC Truck and Coach Division during 1977, in Pontiac, Michigan. First produced in 1977, the RTS was GMC's offering of an Advanced Design Bus design (the other entry was the Grumman 870 by competitor Flxible) and is the descendant of GMC's prototype for the U.S. Department of Transportation's Transbus project. The RTS is notable for its then-futuristic styling featuring automobile-like curved body and window panels; the Advanced Design Buses were meant to be an interim solution between the high-floor transit buses that preceded them, such as the GMC New Look (which had a curved windshield, but flat side glass and body panels), and modern low-floor buses that would facilitate passenger boarding and accessibility. Most current buses are now made by specialized coach manufacturers with flat sides and windows.

Production of the RTS transitioned from GM to Motor Coach Industries (under its Transportation Manufacturing Corporation subsidiary in Roswell, New Mexico) in 1987, moved to NovaBus in 1994, and finally moved to Millenium Transit Services (MTS) in 2003. Production ceased with the closing of MTS in 2009.

The RTS was offered in -, -, and -long models and was built using a modular design that allowed the same parts to be used for all three lengths, the longest of which could seat up to 47 passengers. It was originally powered by either 6- or 8-cylinder versions of Detroit Diesel's venerable Series 71 two-stroke diesel engine channeled through an Allison V730 or ZF 5HP-500 transmission. Later models could be powered by a 6-cylinder Series 92, or the 4-cylinder Series 50 engines.

History

Pre-production

The RTS is the descendant of the GMC RTS-3T, its prototype built for the Transbus project; the RTS-3T was preceded by the RTX (Rapid Transit Experimental), a turbine-powered prototype produced in 1968 that had been under development since 1964. Both the RTX and the RTS-3T Transbus prototype had a similar design as the production RTS, though there were numerous detail differences, such as the prototypes having a less-rounded body design, a one-step entryway, and (in the case of the Transbus) a  length. RTX used the same GT-309 gas turbine engine that had previously been fitted to the Turbo Titan III and Turbo-Cruiser II/III concept vehicles along with a "toric" continuously variable transmission; a 1969 article praised the $2.1 million RTX as having "all the first-class comfort of a Boeing 747 jetliner". However, the passenger capacity of a 40-ft bus was reduced from 50 to 29.

Wanting a backup plan in case the Transbus project was abandoned, GMC decided to modify the RTX/Transbus design and in 1970 began the RTS-II project (designating two axles) that became the earliest RTS with the first prototype being assembled in 1973 at which point the project went onto hiatus. Though closer to its predecessors than the production models, the RTS name debuted with this prototype. After the project was revived in 1974, GMC would later withdraw from the Transbus project and focus their energies on the RTS, which was billed as an Advanced Design Bus representing a "transitional" or "interim" step towards a low-floor bus to facilitate boarding and disembarking. GM announced it was ready to accept orders for the RTS in October 1975.

Production
In September 1985 GMC announced that due to lower than expected, or poor sales of their RTS series buses, that it was in the process of trying to sell or close its transit bus building business, and then later announced that they have sold its RTS design, and patent rights, and bus manufacturing equipment and production line to Transportation Manufacturing Corporation (TMC) of Roswell, New Mexico, a subsidiary of Motor Coach Industries in May 1987, though the two companies completed a joint order for the New York City Transit Authority to prepare TMC for the production. TMC eventually sold the design and patents to NovaBus in September 1994 in the midst of an order for the Massachusetts Bay Transportation Authority. Production under NovaBus continued until 2002 when NovaBus left the U.S. market and concentrated on its latest LFS low-floor design.

Production was revived, however, by Millennium Transit Services, which announced plans to manufacture the bus in both high- and low-floor configurations at the shuttered TMC facilities in Roswell. However, after poor sales and failure to fulfill orders, Millennium ceased production on the RTS and went out of business in 2009. In September 2011, MTS re-entered the market and showcased its latest RTS product at the 2011 APTA Expo in New Orleans. It also announced plans to introduce a  version of the standard floor RTS, which would go into production in the near future. MTS ceased to exist sometime after 2012 after failing to win any substantial bus orders, as the market for high-floor buses (using rear door mounted wheelchair lifts) had essentially vanished by that point; transit agencies had turned to New Flyer Industries, Orion, Gillig, NovaBus, and NABI and their low-floor models equipped with front door wheelchair ramps.

Models
Through the history of the RTS, there have been six generations of production plus two experimental variants (one of which not having made it beyond the prototype stage). 
RTS-01 (1977–78): Produced for a consortium of agencies in California, Massachusetts, and Texas led by Houston, the RTS-01 was similar to the replacement RTS-03 only with some minor differences and a different style bumper.
RTS-03 (1978–80): The first mass-produced version of the RTS that gained popularity among transit authorities. 
RTS-04 (1981–86): Introduced in the early 1980s, due to the popularity of air conditioning, and engine overheating failures of the earlier series RTS buses, the RTS-04 eliminated the sloped rear end with a squared-off rear end in order to provide the necessary space to house a larger air conditioning unit away from the engine compartment. The RTS-04 also introduced a newer DD6V92T engine with turbocharger, and a more pronounced side windows (and openable) that are similar to those featured in the latest RTS buses. These and previous models use independent front suspension. Most buses are given the option of tell-tale lights on each side of the destination sign; some were offered the lights on the backplate near the rear destination sign.
 A , 2 , and a  articulated versions known as the RTS Mega were built, but never passed the prototype status.
RTS-05 (1987): GMC's attempt to move the RTS to a T-drive configuration, where the engine is mounted longitudinally, at a right angle to the axle. Rear module structure was heavily modified for the 'straight-in' arrangement, and would later be used as the design source for the Series 07.
RTS-06 (1986–2002): The most common RTS found today and the only one made by three manufacturers (GMC, TMC, NovaBus). The RTS-06 is extremely similar to the RTS-04, except for slightly different rear ends found in later models that house the Detroit Diesel Series 50 engine. The front suspension for the -06 and later models was changed to a solid beam front axle. LACMTA RTS-06 buses also had a different radiator in the back. 
RTS-07 (1992): Experimental T-drive RTS; never put into mass production. The two models that were produced were for SMART in suburban Detroit.
RTS-08 (1989–94): Front Wheelchair equipped RTS. The Chicago Transit Authority had wanted a bus with a front wheelchair lift and a back window, and contracted TMC to create such a bus. Fifteen -wide RTS-08s were also produced, all of which went to the CTA.  After NovaBus took over production, the RTS-08 was replaced by the RTS-06 WFD (Wide Front Door), which are easily differentiated by the radically different front end and the presence of a slide-glide front door.
RTS Legend (2006–2012): The first Millennium Transit RTS, it is similar to the earlier RTS-06 with the differences of a T-drive configuration and a new front bumper. Wide-door models were reportedly available, but none were ever ordered. For a host of reasons, no more than 10 buses were built before the contracts were cancelled; rejected coaches were resold to Foxwoods Resort Casino, Somerset County Transportation, and Texas A&M University.
RTS Extreme (Production never started): The first semi low-floor version of the RTS.
RTS Express (Production never started): RTS variant for "express" suburban use, with suburban seating and other features commonly found on motorcoaches.

Timeline of options

1978: The first  RTS's are offered as is the option of electronic destination signs (as opposed to rollsigns).
1979: Rear door GM-designed wheelchair lifts were made available.
1981: With an order by the Port Authority of New York and New Jersey (for NYCTA and cousin organization MABSTOA), the option of a pop-open rear door is offered. This option becomes commonplace mostly in large cities as well as with the RTS-08. Also, a set of tell-tale lights were also offered; these lights can be found on each side of the front destination lights. The MBTA has green lights, while NYCTA buses have orange lights.
1984: A one-door suburban variant is offered for the first time, this is soon retired due to a combination of poor sales and decreased wheelchair access. It would be offered again in WFD form under NovaBus.
1986: Methanol-powered RTS's are produced in limited quality, these are the first alternatively fueled RTS buses.
1989: Compressed natural gas-powered RTS's enter production.
1996: First  RTS's produced, some production is moved to the NovaBus plant in Niskayuna, New York.
2001: A test order of diesel-electric hybrid RTS's are produced for the aforementioned NYCTA and New Jersey Transit (one of which is shown above).

Deployment

United States
Long Beach Public Transportation received the first production RTS-01 (TH-8201) in 1977. The agency later restored the bus and donated it to the Museum of Bus Transportation in Hershey, Pennsylvania in 2006. The other agencies participating in the consortium purchase of RTS-01s included HouTran (Houston, Texas), San Antonio MTA, Brockton Area Transit Authority (Brockton, Massachusetts), Dallas Transit System, and AC Transit (serving the East Bay counties of the San Francisco Bay Area). AC Transit did not accept their RTS-01 buses and the order was resold to the neighboring Santa Clara County Transit District.

NFTA Metro of Buffalo, New York received the first order of 96" RTS-03 Buses (Serial Numbers 001–065), whereas Detroit's DDOT received the first 102" order (Serial Numbers 001–070). The RTS-03 featured a modular design, which became the hallmark of the RTS; seamless, un-openable side windows; sliding ("plug") front and rear doors; and a distinctive, sloped rear module. The New York City Transit Authority (NYCTA) ordered two RTS-03's as test vehicles, and sold one each to Green Bus Lines Inc., Queens Transit Corp. and Steinway Transit Corp. after they used the data learned to make changes in their order of RTS buses which became the RTS-04 model.

The first RTS-04 buses were 35' long models delivered to San Antonio in 1980; Pueblo Transportation Co and Metro Dade County Transit Authority also received 40' long RTS-04s in 1980, equipped with the newer Detroit Diesel 6V92TA engine. The NYCTA's first RTS-04s were delivered in 1981 with the proven 6V71 engine.

When the RTS-06 was introduced in 1986, the first bus built was a 96" wide model that went to the Massachusetts Port Authority in Boston; the first quantity order was for the 102" wide models that were delivered to Snohomish County Public Transportation Benefit Area Corporation shortly afterward.

On April 30, 2019, the NYCTA retired the last of these RTS buses from regular passenger service with 1998 NovaBus RTS-06 # 5108 having the honor of doing the final curtain call on the B3 bus route in Brooklyn, New York. A retirement ceremony, with a ceremonial farewell celebrations with a last RTS partial trip on the M55 bus route with 1999 RTS-06 bus 5241 was held on Monday May 6, 2019 to officially announce that these RTS buses were officially retired from passenger service with 1999 RTS-06 buses #'s 5241 & 5249 on display in front of MTA's headquarter's at 2 Broadway for this historic occasion. These RTS buses have been in continuous service for the NYCTA for 38 years since August 5, 1981 when the first MTA NYCTA's GMC RTS-04 # 1201 of East New York Depot was placed into service on the B7 bus route in Brooklyn, New York. The MTA-NYCTA/MABSTOA was the largest RTS fleet operator.

Several RTS-06 buses were rebuilt by Complete Coach Works for the Winston-Salem Transit Authority starting in 2019 to extend their service life for 12 years.

Canada

At the time the RTS entered production in the US, GMDD (GMC's Canadian production arm) considered producing the RTS for the Canadian market. However, an outcry of protest from key transit providers over not wanting the "futuristic" RTS led GMDD to produce the Classic, an updated New Look that was first produced in 1983. The Classic would prove popular with US agencies as well.

When the Classic was retired in 1997, NovaBus decided to begin limited production of the RTS for the Canadian market. Produced from 1997 to 2001, most of the RTS models made for Canadian agencies were the RTS-06 WFD variant with the majority being sold to agencies in the eastern part of the country. Notably, the Toronto Transit Commission in Ontario operated a fleet of 52 buses built in 1998 while Société de transport de l'Outaouais in Quebec had 12 buses built in 2000.

Quebec-based Dupont Trolley Industries, specializing in rebuilding buses, previously offered a rebuilt RTS known as the Victoria with several styling changes. These buses are fairly uncommon, with most examples found in the fleets of transit operators in Montréal's suburbs (CIT Roussillon, Sainte-Julie public transit, CIT Chambly-Richelieu-Carignan).

Elsewhere
From 1985 to 1997 Daewoo Bus built the BH120 Royale and the BH115H, a bus originally styled in a manner similar to the RTS. However, according to the Daewoo catalog, it states that it incorporated GMC's intercity coach model. Although in reality, the Royale has incorporated chassis from the Japanese bus manufacturer, Isuzu with Daewoo built MAN engine. The Royale compared to RTS has a completely different body structure, boasting underfloor baggage compartments, and sporting no modular construction.  This bus is frequently assumed to be a foreign variant of an RTS, but apart from appearance, it shares nothing with it. The BH120 Royale was later restyled and renamed as BH120 Royale Super which distanced itself visually from the RTS and resembles its Japanese counterpart Isuzu Super Cruiser.

However, General Motors did briefly consider building small quantities of the RTS at its GM Holden's subsidiary in Australia. A press release was issued noting the feasibility study, but no production commenced. Additionally, General Motors' Diesel Division in London, Ontario, Canada, also launched a study into building RTS coaches within its facilities, but never actually built any coaches.

Manufacturers

 GMC as RTS 1977–1987
 TMC as RTS 1987–1994
 NovaBus as RTS 1994–2002
 Millennium Transit Services as RTS Legend, Express, Extreme, Evolution 2003–2012
 Dupont Industries – rebuilds of old RTS buses and renamed as Victoria

Millennium Transit Services

Millennium Transit Services, LLC was a bus manufacturer formed in 2003 to take over the former Nova Bus manufacturing plant in Roswell, New Mexico and continue construction of the Rapid Transit Series (RTS) buses that were built there. The company was composed mostly of former NovaBus employees and financed by the city of Roswell, the State of New Mexico, and Pioneer Bank.

On July 27, 2005, the company announced its first major order: 68 transit and 221 suburban buses for New Jersey Transit. Full delivery of this order was expected to commence late in the third quarter of 2006, but "the inability to obtain necessary funds" forced the cancellation of the order. All units completed for New Jersey Transit at that point were rejected and resold to Foxwoods Resort Casino (five transit), Somerset County Transportation (Somerset County, New Jersey) (one transit and one suburban), and Texas A&M University (25 transits).

Besides the New Jersey Transit order, MTS had secured a contract from the City of El Paso, Texas, to convert 25 Transportation Manufacturing Corporation-built RTS buses from diesel to clean-burning CNG. The second order was from Pueblo Transit for two transit buses. The New Jersey Transit order was actually the third order for MTS. Other orders included those from Santa Fe Trails and Beaumont Municipal Transit System. These latter two have since been canceled.

On August 29, 2008, the company filed for Chapter 11 bankruptcy protection. The company has cleared Chapter 11 and is poised to return to full production, pending any significant orders.

On February 26, 2012, Millennium suspended production of its buses in order to do a full inventory of its Roswell facility. The factory reopened in the summer of 2012; however, Millennium had yet to win any significant orders to date, since the cancellations.

A map check in 2019 appears to indicate that MTS no longer exists as an entity, and their facilities at 42 W-Earl Cummings Loop is now a vacant building and lot. The whole property, formerly occupied by MTS, is available for lease as of January 28, 2019, and for sale as of June 28, 2022.

See also

GMC New Look – Previous 1960s generation GMC bus
Flxible Metro – major competitor to the Rapid Transit Series
GMC/MCI/NovaBus Classic – Updated version of the New Look, offered as an alternative to the RTS
Neoplan Transliner – ADB competitor

References

Bibliography

External links
 GMC/TMC RTS II Production Lists
 Millennium Transit
 
 

Buses
Police vehicles
Low-floor buses
Coaches (bus)
Buses of Canada
Buses of the United States
General Motors buses
Vehicles introduced in 1977
Cab over vehicles